is a Japanese football player. He plays for Tochigi Uva FC.

Playing career
Toshihiko Uchiyama played for Fukushima United FC from 2013 to 2014. in 2015, he moved to Tochigi Uva FC.

Club statistics
Updated to 20 February 2017.

References

External links

1989 births
Living people
Ryutsu Keizai University alumni
Association football people from Chiba Prefecture
Japanese footballers
J3 League players
Japan Football League players
Fukushima United FC players
Tochigi City FC players
Association football midfielders